Srećko Blaž Rover (3 February 1920 – 10 September 2005) was a member of the fascist, Croatian ultranationalist Ustaša movement.

Life 
During World War II he became an officer of the Ustaše Surveillance Service and a judge in the Mobile Court Martial system of the Nazi puppet state of the Independent State of Croatia (NDH) under the control of Ustaša leader, Ante Pavelić. In these roles Rover was responsible for the capture, torture and executions of a large number of Serbs, Jews and anti-fascists in the Sarajevo region. He was later promoted to the rank of lieutenant in the Ustaša army and became an officer in the armoured corps of Pavelić's bodyguard unit, the PTS.

After the war, Rover fled the defeated NDH regime and was captured by Allied forces. He was placed in the role of leading the logistics of the anti-Communist Križari insurgent missions into the newly formed Communist Yugoslavia. He helped organise the disastrous mission which resulted in the capture or execution of all its members including the Ustaša leader Božidar Kavran. Rover was dismissed from his role for this and was transferred to displaced persons camps in Italy.

Rover was able to migrate to Australia in 1950, where he became a prominent member of the Ustaše in Australia. Rover was permitted by the anti-Communist officials in the Australian government and intelligence agency to establish and organise splinter groups of the Ustaše including the Croatian National Resistance (HNO) and the Croatian Revolutionary Brotherhood (HRB). These groups were able conduct terrorist activities against Yugoslav interests in Australia and send teams of trained insurgents into Yugoslavia with the aim of igniting an anti-communist revolt in that country.

Rover attempted to become world leader of the HNO in 1972, but a crackdown on Ustaše groups in Australia at that time, interfered with this goal. In early 1973, Rover has a nervous breakdown and resigned from all Croatian ultranationalist leadership positions. He was later investigated for war crimes during his time as an Ustaša official in the NDH, but no prosecutions were ever made. He died in Melbourne in 2005.

References

Croatian fascists
Ustaša Militia
Ustaše
1920 births
2005 deaths